The 22nd Army Corps, was a tactical formation of the Imperial Russian Army based in the Grand Duchy of Finland before the beginning of the First World War.  After seeing much service during the war, the corps was disbanded following the October Revolution.

Russian Empire 
In 1905, as part of the ongoing re-organisation of the Imperial Russian Army's higher-up fighting review, the 22nd Army Corps was formed with its headquarters in Helsingfors, today the Finnish capital of Helsinki.  This new corps was known as the "Finnish/Finland Corps", as its troops were exclusively from the Grand Duchy of Finland, a sub-division of the Russian Empire.  On formation, the new corps was assigned to the Saint Petersburg Military District, itself headquartered just over the border in the capital; Saint Petersburg.

When the First World War began, the corps was placed under the command of the 9th Army and transferred from army to army while seeing action of the Eastern Front.  In November 1917, just after the October Revolution, the corps joined the new Western Front.

In 1917, the corps transferred control to the new Russian Republic, and later that year after the October Revolution, was disbanded.

Composition

1914 
The below organisation is that of the corps on formation:

 22nd Army Corps, HQ in Helsingfors
 20th Finnish Dragoon Regiment
 Orenburg Cossack Division
 22nd Mortar Artillery Division
 22nd Sapper Battalion
 1st Finnish Rifle Brigade, HQ in Helsingfors
 1st Finnish Rifle Regiment
 2nd Finnish Rifle Regiment
 3rd Finnish Rifle Regiment
 4th Finnish Rifle Regiment
 2nd Finnish Rifle Brigade, HQ in Vyborg
 5th Finnish Rifle Regiment
 6th Finnish Rifle Regiment
 7th Finnish Rifle Regiment
 8th Finnish Rifle Regiment

1916 
The structure of the corps after its 1916 reorganisation was:

 22nd Army Corps
 6th Ugletsky Orenburg Ataman Cossack Regiment
 8th Orenburg Cossack Regiment
 30th Separate Don Cossack Squadron
 22nd Mortar Artillery Division
 22nd Sapper Battalion
 1st Finnish Infantry Division
 1st Finnish Rifle Artillery Brigade
 1st Brigade
 1st Finnish Rifle Regiment
 2nd Finnish Rifle Regiment
 2nd Brigade
 3rd Finnish Rifle Regiment
 4th Finnish Rifle Regiment
 2nd Finnish Infantry Division
 3rd Finnish Rifle Artillery Brigade
 1st Brigade
 9th Finnish Rifle Regiment
 10th Finnish Rifle Regiment
 2nd Brigade
 11th Finnish Rifle Regiment
 12th Finnish Rifle Regiment

Commanders 
Divisional Commanders

 1905—1905; Lieutenant General Ivan Makarovich Dzhambakurian-Orbeliani
 1905—1906; LtGen Anton Egorovich Saltz
 1906—1908; LtGen, later General of Cavalry Vladimir Alexandrovich Bekman
 1908—1912; LtGen, later General of Infantry Peter Smitrievich Olkhovsky
 1913—1917; LtGen, later General of Infantry Alexander Freidrikhovich Brinken
 1917—1917; LtGen Nikolai Afruchev
 1917—1917; LtGen Alexander Alekseevich Bezkrovny

Assignments 
Imperial Russian Army

Assignments of the corps during the First World War included;

 1914—1914; 9th Army
 1914—1915; 10th Army
 1915—1915; 8th Army
 1915—1915; 11th Army
 1915—1917; 7th Army
 1917—1917; Western Front

Footnotes 

Corps of the Russian Empire
Military units and formations established in 1905
Military units and formations disestablished in 1918
1905 establishments in Finland
1918 disestablishments in Russia